A Clubbable Woman is a 1970 crime novel by Reginald Hill, the first novel in the Dalziel and Pascoe series.

Publication history
1970, London: Collins Crime Club , Pub date 28 September 1970, Hardback
2007, New York: Felony & Mayhem Press , Pub date September 2007

1970 British novels
Novels by Reginald Hill
1970 debut novels
Collins Crime Club books